Tansy Davies (born 29 May 1973, Bristol) is an English composer of contemporary classical music. She won the BBC Young Composers' Competition in 1996 and has written works for ensembles such as the London Symphony Orchestra, the BBC Symphony Orchestra and the BBC Scottish Symphony Orchestra.

Early life
Tansy Davies started out singing and playing guitar in a rock band. She developed an interest in composition in her teens and studied composition and French horn at the Colchester Institute  
followed by further study with Simon Bainbridge at the Guildhall School of Music and Drama and with Simon Holt. Tansy Davies has been Composer-in-Residence at Royal Holloway, University of London (where she gained a PhD) and currently teaches at the Royal Academy of Music in London. She also worked for three years as a freelance horn player and was a member of the Moon Velvet Collective.

Commissions
Davies was a prize winner in the 1996 BBC Young Composers' Competition. She has received a number of commissions from a number of organisations, for such works as the following:
 Iris (2004), commission from the Cheltenham Festival
 Residuum (2004), commission from the Orchestra of the Swan
 Spiral House (2004), commission from the BBC Scottish Symphony Orchestra
 Tilting (2005), commission from the London Symphony Orchestra
 Spine (2005), commission from the Aldeburgh Festival
 As With Voices And With Tears (2010), commission for The Portsmouth Grammar School
 Christmas hath a darkness (2011), commission for A Festival of Nine Lessons and Carols, King's College Cambridge 2011.
 "Between Worlds" (2015), a commission from The Barbican Centre, for The English National Opera.

Other works include Streamlines (CBSO Youth Orchestra/Paul Daniel); Contraband (Britten Sinfonia); kingpin (City of London Sinfonia), Adorned (Haugesund CO – Norway), Hinterland (Cheltenham Festival), Rift (BBC Concert Orchestra) and Elephant and Castle (a large-scale multi-media work for the 2007 Aldeburgh Festival, co-written with Warp Records DJ Mira Calix, and directed by Tim Hopkins).  In February 2007, the Birmingham Contemporary Music Group and Thomas Adès gave the premiere of Falling Angel, a 20-minute commission for large ensemble in Birmingham, and at the Présences festival in Paris.  Her first commission for The Proms, Wild Card for orchestra, received its world premiere in September 2010.

Musical style
Davies' music is informed by the worlds of the classical avant-garde, funk and experimental rock.  As well, her scores contain unusual directions, such as 'urban, muscular', 'seedy, low slung', 'stealthy' and 'solid, grinding'.  Other influences on her compositions have included the architecture of Zaha Hadid, in her trumpet concerto Spiral House. She has also collaborated with the video artist Zara Matthews.

Recordings

Davies has been the subject of three portrait CDs, Troubairitz (Nonclassical Recordings, 2011), Spine (NMC Recordings, 2012), and Nature (NMC, 2021). Other compositions appear in various anthologies, notably on the NMC label.

Compositions

References

External links 
 Official Tansy Davies website
 Faber Music page on Tansy Davies
 Tansy Davies on the British Music Collection

1973 births
Living people
Alumni of Royal Holloway, University of London
20th-century classical composers
21st-century classical composers
English classical composers
Musicians from Bristol
Women classical composers
20th-century English composers
20th-century English women musicians
21st-century British composers
21st-century English women musicians
20th-century women composers
21st-century women composers